55 Pegasi is a single star in the northern constellation of Pegasus. It is visible to the naked eye as a faint, reddish-hued point of light with a baseline apparent visual magnitude of 4.51. The star is located approximately 302 light years away from the Sun based on parallax, but it is moving closer with a radial velocity of −5 km/s.

This is an aging red giant star on the asymptotic giant branch with a stellar classification of M1IIIab, having exhausted the supply of hydrogen at its core then expanded to 46 times the Sun's radius. It is a suspected variable, with an observed magnitude that ranges from 4.50 down to 4.56. The star is around two billion years old with 1.6 times the mass of the Sun. It is radiating 483 times the luminosity of the Sun from its swollen photosphere at an effective temperature of 3,994 K.

References

M-type giants
Asymptotic-giant-branch stars
Suspected variables

Pegasus (constellation)
BD+08 4997
Pegasi, 55
218329
114144
8795